Karan (Qaran) is a rural locality (a selo) in Izhberdinsky Selsoviet, Kugarchinsky District, Bashkortostan, Russia. The population was 119 as of 2010. There are 2 streets.

Geography 
Karan is located 26 km south of Mrakovo (the district's administrative centre) by road. Sapykovo is the nearest rural locality.

References 

Rural localities in Kugarchinsky District